The Karachi Port Trust Stadium is a football stadium in the West Wharf area of Karachi, Pakistan. It is located inside the Benazir Sports Complex.

It is the home ground of KPT FC, among other football clubs.

Location 
It is located inside the Benazir Sports Complex on Akbar Siddiqui Road in the West Wharf Industrial Area of Karachi.

Matches 
It has hosted several national and local football competitions, including the 2009-10 Pakistan Premier League, 2010-11 Pakistan Premier League, 2011–12 Pakistan Premier League, and the 2012 KPT Challenge Cup

See also
 List of stadiums by capacity
 List of stadiums in Pakistan
 List of cricket grounds in Pakistan
 List of sports venues in Karachi
 List of sports venues in Lahore
 List of sports venues in Faisalabad

References

Stadiums in Pakistan
Buildings and structures in Karachi
Football venues in Pakistan
Stadiums in Karachi